A comedian is one who entertains through comedy, such as jokes and other forms of humour.  Following is a list of comedians, comedy groups, and comedy writers.

Pakistani comedians 
(sorted alphabetically by surname)

A

Albela (actor)
Ali Gul Pir
 Amanullah (comedian)

I

Iftikhar Thakur

M

Mir Mohammad Ali
Muhammad Faizan Sheikh
Moin Akhtar
Mohammad Saeed Khan(Rangeela)

N

 Nasir Chinyoti
 Nazar (died 20 January 1992)

Saad Haroon
Shafaat Ali
Shakeel Siddiqui
Sohail Ahmed

Pakistani
comedians